Rohit Dhruw (born 21 May 1982) is an Indian cricketer. He made his List A debut for Chhattisgarh in the 2016–17 Vijay Hazare Trophy on 28 February 2017. He made his Twenty20 debut for Chhattisgarh in the 2017–18 Zonal T20 League on 10 January 2018.

References

External links
 

1982 births
Living people
Indian cricketers
Chhattisgarh cricketers
Place of birth missing (living people)